Staré Město is a municipality and village in Bruntál District in the Moravian-Silesian Region of the Czech Republic. It has about 900 inhabitants.

Administrative parts
The village of Nová Véska is an administrative part of Staré Město.

History
The first written mention of Staré Město is from 1377.

According to the Austrian census of 1910 the village had 1,100 inhabitants, all of them were German-speaking. Most populous religious groups were Roman Catholics with 1,089 (99%).

References

External links

Villages in Bruntál District